Rugby sevens at the 2022 Commonwealth Games was held at the Coventry Stadium from 29 to 31 July 2022.

A total of 16 teams competed in the men's tournament, while eight contested the women's tournament. South Africa won the men's tournament, while Australia won the women's.

Schedule
The competition schedule was as follows:

Venue
The tournaments were originally scheduled to take place at Villa Park, but instead took place at the Coventry Stadium in Coventry. The venue was moved because there were concerns with Villa Park being available. The football season was anticipated to start earlier because of the 2022 FIFA World Cup scheduling.

The adjacent Coventry Arena will play host to judo and wrestling.

Medal summary

Medal table

Medallists

Qualification

Summary

Men
Sixteen nations qualified for the men's tournament at the 2022 Commonwealth Games:

 The host nation.
 The top nine nations in combined standings from the 2018–19 and 2019–20 World Rugby Sevens Series, excluding the host nation.
 The top nation not yet qualified from each of the four regional qualifiers, plus the second nation from the Africa and Asia qualifiers.

Women
Eight nations qualified for the women's tournament at the 2022 Commonwealth Games:

 The host nation.
 The top two nations in combined standings from the 2018–19 and 2019–20 World Rugby Women's Sevens Series, excluding the host nation.
 The top North American nation in the aforementioned standings, or the second nation if the former makes the top two outright (excluding the host nation).
 The top nation not yet qualified from each of the four regional qualifiers.

;Notes

Competitions

References

 
Rugby sevens
2022
Rugby sevens competitions in England
2022 rugby sevens competitions
International rugby union competitions hosted by England